José Centenera (12 December 1931 – 11 January 2021) was a Spanish equestrian. He competed in two events at the 1960 Summer Olympics.

References

External links
 

1931 births
2021 deaths
Spanish male equestrians
Olympic equestrians of Spain
Equestrians at the 1960 Summer Olympics
Sportspeople from the Province of Guadalajara